Surrender is the only studio album by American contemporary R&B group Kut Klose. It was released in 1995, through Elektra Records, and was mostly produced by the group's mentor, Keith Sweat. The album was met with mild commercial success, making it to three Billboard charts, peaking at number 66 on the Billboard 200.

Three singles were released from the album. "Lovely Thang" and "Surrender" both became minor hits on the R&B singles chart, while the album's lead single "I Like" went to 34 on the Billboard Hot 100, becoming the group's only top-40 hit.

Track listing
"Lay My Body Down" – 4:19  
"Don't Change" – 4:24  
"Get Up on It" – 5:06  
"Do Me" – 4:44  
"Lovely Thang" – 4:19  
"Surrender" – 5:18  
"I Like" – 4:23  
"Keep On" – 3:16  
"Giving You My Love Again" – 5:23  
"Sexual Baby" – 4:42  
"Like You've Never Been Done" – 4:48

Charts

Weekly charts

Year-end charts

References

1995 debut albums
Albums produced by Keith Sweat
Contemporary R&B albums by American artists
Elektra Records albums